Paul Pesco (born May 13, 1959) is an American session guitarist, singer-songwriter, film score composer and record producer.

Biography 
Pesco was born in Canandaigua, New York, to a Sicilian father (an opera singer and voice instructor) and Korean mother (an author). The family lived for a time in Germany during Paul's youth before returning to New York. He graduated from Northport High School in 1977. As of November 2012, Pesco resides in Millbrook, New York, where he maintains a home recording studio.

Beginning on the piano, Pesco would gradually build up a working proficiency with several different instruments before finding a natural fit with the guitar.  He began seriously pursuing a career in music by working as a rehearsal technician at S.I.R. Studios, where he had brushes with numerous prominent artists.  Having already played on some early sessions by a then-relatively unknown Madonna, Pesco was offered a position as a "utility man" (playing second guitar and keyboards) with Atlantic Starr on the band's 1982 tour, which would be his first prolific gig. Following this tour, Pesco was again recruited by Madonna to record on her self-titled debut album.

Soon thereafter, Pesco joined up with the innovative techno funk group the System, performing on the band's studio albums as well as tours and becoming an instrumental part of launching the group's career.  It was through his work with the System that he first came to the attention of the group Hall & Oates, with whom he would soon develop a long-term association.

These early gigs segued into future sessions with other high-profile artists, and his session career blossomed from there. He played on demos for disco artist Lourett Russell Grant. He became an in-demand session player throughout the 1980s and has remained one of the most sought-after session musicians into the present.

Meanwhile, Pesco had also maintained his working relationship with Madonna, having recorded and toured with her (the first album, songs "Lucky Star" and "Burning Up" as well as The Virgin Tour in 1985 and the Erotica album and subsequent Girlie Show World Tour in 1993). The Madonna demos on which he had played guitar prior to touring with Atlantic Starr initially secured her recording contract with Sire Records in the early 1980s, which have since been released as the Pre-Madonna album.

Other highlights
In 1986, Pesco played on Steve Winwood's album Back in the High Life (on the song "The Finer Things") and on tour.

In 1989, Pesco released a solo album, Make It Reality, which featured himself on lead vocals, guitar, and often other instruments, backed by other session musicians.

In 1991, Pesco joined C+C Music Factory, creating the guitar parts for "Gonna Make You Sweat (Everybody Dance Now)", "Things That Make You Go Hmmm...", among many other songs.

In 2001, he became musical director and guitarist for Jennifer Lopez, for her promotional tour and NBC music special. Pesco had worked with J-Lo in the studio, playing guitar on the song "Play" from her second album J.Lo.

In late 2002, he joined the house band for morning talk show The Wayne Brady Show on ABC. Around the same time, he worked on several film soundtracks including Around the Bend, Be Cool, Happy Feet and Robots with composer John Powell, the Brando documentary and the comedic short film, Basta Pasta with composer Andrea Morricone.

Pesco has also composed and performed on soundtracks for films such as Roxanne, Earth Girls Are Easy, Buffy the Vampire Slayer, Encino Man, Wild Orchid, Coming to America, Fried Green Tomatoes, Boca and Tap.

In 2005, Pesco co-composed the musical score for the documentary film The Canary Effect from director Robin Davey.

Pesco has recorded and toured with Joan Baez.

He is a member and co-producer of John Blackwell's John Blackwell Project (4ever Jia album).

He is also a member of drummer Dave Weckl's group (Multiplicity album).

Association with Hall and Oates
Pesco was the lead guitarist and musical director of the rock and soul duo Hall & Oates. He also performed the same role for Daryl Hall's successful reality music television program, Live from Daryl's House, and toured with Hall's solo band.

H&O were aware of Pesco because of his studio track record with the System, and also his prolific work with many other artists. Initially, that led to Pesco playing guitar on their Ooh Yeah! album in 1988.  He joined Hall & Oates again in 1996 for the recording sessions and tour for the Marigold Sky album.

He remained with the band until 2001, when he began working with Jennifer Lopez.

In 2010, Pesco rejoined Hall & Oates upon the death of the band's longtime bassist, Tom "T-Bone" Wolk. He remained with the band through 2013 and had a highly visible role during Live from Daryl's House broadcasts.

On January 6, 2014, Pesco publicly acknowledged his departure from the Live from Daryl's House show and the Hall & Oates band. On his Facebook page, Pesco wrote, "I am no longer involved with LFDH or H&O ... I was replaced ... Not sure why ... Sorry that I couldn't be more informative." He added, "No one is more disappointed than I am ... I loved being a part of LFDH." He concluded, "Sometimes the tail wags the dog.
I think Daryl and John made a decision based on misinformation and lies...
It's a shame..."

He appeared on June 26 at Summerfest 2014 in Milwaukee.

Gear / endorsements 
 Suhr Guitars, amps and pedals
 ESP Guitars
 Taylor Guitars
 Seymour Duncan Pickups
 DR Handmade Strings
 Line 6 digital effects
 Fishman Pickups
 Empirical Labs
 QSC Audio Products
 PreSonus StudioLive
 Quilter Labs (Amps)
 Tronical
 Cusack Pedals
 Soundtoys Plugins
 PRA WiC digital wireless systems for guitar

Solo discography

Album
 Make It Reality (Sire), 1989

Singles
 "Black Is Black" (Sire)
 "I'm Hypnotized" (Sire)
 "The Politics of Love" (Sire)

Collaborations

References

External links

1959 births
People from Long Island
Living people
Singers from New York (state)
Songwriters from New York (state)
Hall & Oates members
American people of Italian descent
American musicians of Korean descent
American session musicians
American film score composers
Daryl Hall and the Daryl's House Band members
C+C Music Factory members